Franjo Hanaman (June 30, 1878 – January 23, 1941) was a Croatian inventor, engineer, and chemist, who gained world recognition for inventing the world's first applied electric light-bulb with a metal filament (tungsten) with his assistant Alexander Just, independently of his contemporaries.

Franjo Hanaman was born in the village of Drenovci in Slavonia (at the time Kingdom of Croatia-Slavonia, Austria-Hungary) to a Croatian family as a second child of father Gjuro Hanaman and Emilija Mandušić.

Just and Hanaman were granted the Hungarian Patent #34541 on December 13, 1904 in Budapest. His invention of tungsten filament was also applied in improving early diodes and triodes.

He died in Zagreb (at the time Kingdom of Yugoslavia).

References

1878 births
1941 deaths
People from Drenovci
Croatian inventors
Electrical engineers
Croatian chemists
Austro-Hungarian scientists
Burials at Mirogoj Cemetery
Engineers from Zagreb
Austro-Hungarian inventors